Lost Ocean is the debut album released by Lost Ocean, under the Credential Records label. It features four songs of their EP, Night to Life. The album was released on February 20, 2007.

Track listing

References

2007 debut albums
Lost Ocean albums
Credential Recordings albums